Combretastatin B-1 is a combretastatin and a dihydrostilbenoid. It can be found in Combretum caffrum, the Eastern Cape South African bushwillow tree or in Combretum kraussii, the forest bushwillow.

It can be produced by selective hydrogenation of Combretastatin A-1.

It is a potent inhibitor of microtubule assembly in vitro.

References 

Combretastatins
Dihydrostilbenoids